Alles kann besser werden ("Everything Can Get Better") is the fifth studio album by German singer Xavier Naidoo, released by Naidoo Records on 9 October 2009 in German-speaking Europe.

Track listing

Charts

Weekly charts

Year-end charts

Certifications and sales

Release history

References

External links
 

2009 albums
Xavier Naidoo albums